Brit Tzedek v'Shalom, also known as Jewish Alliance for Justice and Peace, was an organization of American Jews and describes its members as "deeply committed to Israel's well-being through the achievement of a negotiated settlement to the long-standing Israeli–Palestinian conflict". They describe this as "necessitating an end to Israel's occupation of land acquired during the 1967 war and an end to Palestinian terrorism". The group endorses a two-state solution to the conflict. The founding president of this organization is Marcia Freedman.

In 2006, it collaborated with Americans for Peace Now and the Israel Policy Forum to lobby Congress against the Palestinian Anti-Terrorism Act 2006 (H.R. 4681), which was supported by the American Israel Public Affairs Committee (AIPAC). The bill eventually became law, but in a form that was quite different from the original language proposed by AIPAC.

 they list 38 chapters.  A press release from October 14, 2006 claimed more than 35,000 members.

According to its January 2010 newsletter, it integrated into J Street.  This is apparently for strategic coordination, instead of an outright merger.

See also
 Jewish Voice for Peace
 Americans for Peace Now
 Partners for Progressive Israel
 Brit Tzedek v'Shalom/Jewish Alliance for Justice and Peace Records at the American Jewish Historical Society

References

Further reading
 Official Website
 J Street Makes a Strategic Acquisition, by Nathan Guttman, The Forward, September 4, 2009.

Jewish-American political organizations
Jewish anti-occupation groups
Zionism in the United States